Constantin Cojocariu (born June 27, 1965 in Târgu Neamț), is a former Romanian former rugby union player who played as a lock. He played for Baia Mare.

International career
Cojocariu gathered 40 caps for Romania, from his debut in 1990 to his last game in 1996. He scored 2 tries during his international career, 8 points on aggregate. He was a member of his national side for the 2nd and 3rd Rugby World Cups in 1991 and 1995 and played in 6 group matches without scoring. He was also part of his national team for the historic win against France in Auch on 24 May 1990.

References

External links

1965 births
Living people
Romanian rugby union players
Romania international rugby union players
Rugby union locks
People from Târgu Neamț